The Advocates Library, founded in 1682, is the law library of the Faculty of Advocates, in Edinburgh. It served as the national deposit library of Scotland until 1925, at which time through an Act of Parliament the National Library of Scotland was created. All the non-legal collections were transferred to the National Library. Today, it alone of the Scottish libraries still holds the privilege of receiving a copy of every law book entered at Stationers' Hall.

The library forms part of the complex that includes Parliament House, located on the Royal Mile.

History
The Library was formally opened in 1689. It was an initiative of George Mackenzie.

The present library building was designed by William Henry Playfair in 1830, and is a category A listed building.

Librarian Samuel Halkett began an ambitious catalogue, based on the rules of John Winter Jones for the British Museum catalogue of 1839, but with extensive  biographical information on authors. It was published in six volumes, from 1858 to 1878. Halkett's successor, Thomas Hill Jamieson, had to deal with a fire that damaged some thousands of books on 9 March 1875.

By 1923 the library held around 725,000 books and pamphlets.

Keepers
1684–1693 James Nasmith (NB in place before official opening.)
1693–1702 James Stevenson
1702–1728 John Spottiswoode of that ilk 
1703–1718 (joint keeper) Adam Colt or Coult
1705–1719 (joint keeper) William Forbes
1730–1752 Thomas Ruddiman
1735–1766 (assistant keeper) Walter Goodall
1752–1757 David Hume
1757–1758 Adam Ferguson
1758–1765 William Wallace
1766–1794 Alexander Brown
1794–1818 Alexander Manners
1820–1848 David Irving
1849–1871 Samuel Halkett
1871–1876 Thomas Hill Jamieson 
1877–1906 James Toshach Clark
1906–1925 William Kirk Dickson
1925-1928 James Stevenson Leadbetter
1928-1948 Robert Candlish Henderson
1948-1949 Henry Wallace Guthrie
1949-1956 Thomas Pringle McDonald
1956-1970 Margaret Henderson Kidd
1970-1972 Alexander John Mackenzie Stuart
1972-1977 Charles Kemp Davidson
1977-1987 John Taylor Cameron
1987–1994 Brian Gill
1994-2002 Angus Stewart
2002-2004 Edgar Prais
2004-2008 Stephen Woolman
2008-2021 Mungo Bovey QC
2021      Stephen O'Rourke QC
2022- present Neil Mackenzie KC

See also
 Edinburgh City Chambers

References
Patrick Cadell and Ann Matheson, editors (1989). For the Encouragement of Learning: Scotland's National Library 1689–1989. Edinburgh: HMSO.
John St Clair and Roger Craik (1989). The Advocates' Library: 300 Years of a National Institution 1689-1989. Edinburgh HMSO.

Notes

External links

 

1682 establishments in Scotland
Libraries in Edinburgh
Scots law
Law libraries in the United Kingdom
College of Justice
Category A listed buildings in Edinburgh
Listed library buildings in Scotland
Royal Mile
Academic libraries in Scotland
Deposit libraries